Roch Boivin (October 14, 1912 – January 17, 1979) was a Canadian politician and a two-term Member of the Legislative Assembly of Quebec.

Background

He was born on October 14, 1912 in Chicoutimi, Saguenay-Lac-Saint-Jean and became a physician.

Mayor

Boivin served as Mayor of Chicoutimi-Nord, Quebec from 1949 to 1972.

Member of the legislature

He ran as a Union Nationale candidate in the 1966 election in the provincial district of Dubuc and won. He was re-elected in the 1970 election.

Cabinet Member

He was appointed to the Cabinet in 1966 and served as Minister without Portfolio assigned to Health until 1970.  Boivin lost the 1973 election against Liberal candidate Ghislain Harvey.

Death

He died on January 17, 1979.

References

1912 births
1979 deaths
Mayors of places in Quebec
Politicians from Saguenay, Quebec
Union Nationale (Quebec) MNAs